Luca Veronese (born 6 February 1991) is a retired French professional footballer who played as a goalkeeper. He made his professional debut for Istres in a 1–2 defeat against Clermont Foot in the Coupe de la Ligue on 7 August 2012.

External links
Lucas Veronese career statistics at foot-national.com

1991 births
Living people
Sportspeople from Alpes-Maritimes
French footballers
Association football goalkeepers
OGC Nice players
FC Istres players
Amiens SC players
Ligue 1 players
Ligue 2 players
Championnat National players
People from Cagnes-sur-Mer
Footballers from Provence-Alpes-Côte d'Azur